Khyber Pakhtunkhwa Highway S-1 is a  provincial highway which extends from Peshawar to Hattar in Khyber Pakhtunkhwa province, Pakistan. Originally several separate roads, the Pakhtunkhwa Highways Authority merged them together to form one continuous road.

Route

Peshawar-Charsadda Road

Charsadda-Mardan Road

Mardan-Swabi Road

Swabi-Topi Road

Topi-Ghazi Road

Ghazi-Sirikot Road

Sirikot-Haripur Road

Kot Najibullah Road

See also
Provincial Highways of Khyber Pakhtunkhwa

Notes 

Highways in Khyber Pakhtunkhwa
Roads in Khyber Pakhtunkhwa